"Fickle Public Speaking" is a 1983 single by former Department S singer Main T Possee, with Paul Weller guesting on guitar. It charted at No. 89 on the UK Singles Chart.

Department S guitarist Mike Herbage has attacked this song, calling it "Lou Reed trying to be Isaac Hayes" and "abysmal".

References

1983 singles
1983 songs
Songs written by Paul Weller
Songs written by Vaughn Toulouse